This article is a list of diseases of pocketbook plants (Calceolaria crenatiflora).

Bacterial diseases

Fungal diseases

References
Common Names of Diseases, The American Phytopathological Society

Pocketbook plant